Paul Martin Simon (November 29, 1928 – December 9, 2003) was an American author and politician from Illinois. He served in the United States House of Representatives from 1975 to 1985 and in the United States Senate from 1985 to 1997. A member of the Democratic Party, he unsuccessfully ran for the 1988 Democratic presidential nomination.

After his political career, he founded the Public Policy Institute at Southern Illinois University Carbondale in Carbondale, Illinois, which was later named for him. There he taught classes on politics, history and journalism.

Simon was famous for his distinctive bowtie and horn-rimmed glasses.

Early life and career
Simon was born in Eugene, Oregon on November 29, 1928. He was the son of Martin Paul Simon, a Lutheran minister and missionary to China, and Ruth Lilly (née Tolzmann) Simon, a Lutheran missionary as well. His family was of German descent.

Simon attended Concordia University, a Lutheran school in Portland. He later attended the University of Oregon and Dana College in Blair, Nebraska, but never graduated.

After meeting with local Lions Club members, he borrowed $3,600 to take over the defunct Troy Call newspaper in 1948, becoming the nation's youngest editor-publisher, of the renamed Troy Tribune in Troy, Illinois, and eventually built a chain of 14 weekly newspapers. His activism against gambling, prostitution, and government corruption while at the Troy Tribune influenced the newly elected governor, Adlai Stevenson II, to take a stand on these issues, creating national exposure for Simon that later resulted in his testifying before the Kefauver Commission.

In May 1951, Simon left his newspaper and enlisted in the United States Army. Simon served in West Germany during the Korean War. Assigned to the Counterintelligence Corps, he attained the rank of private first class and was discharged in June 1953.

State political career

Upon his discharge, Simon was elected to and began his political career in the Illinois House of Representatives. As a state representative, Simon was an advocate for civil rights, and once hosted an event attended by former First Lady Eleanor Roosevelt. After a primary debate with two other candidates, a newspaper account of a debate stated "the man with the bowtie did well," and he adopted his trademark bowtie and horned glasses.

In 1963, Simon was elected to the Illinois State Senate, serving until 1969 when he became the Lieutenant Governor of Illinois. As a Democrat, he served with Republican Governor, Richard B. Ogilvie. Their bipartisan teamwork produced the state's first income tax and paved the way for the state's 1969 constitutional convention, which created the fourth and current Illinois Constitution. The Ogilvie-Simon administration was the only one in Illinois history in which the elected governor and lieutenant governor were from different political parties: The Illinois constitution now pairs the offices as running mates on a ticket.

In 1972, Simon ran for the Democratic nomination for governor.  Despite his longtime reputation as a political reformer, he was supported by the Cook County Democratic machine, led by Chicago Mayor Richard J. Daley. Nevertheless, Simon lost to Dan Walker, who went on to win the general election.

Out of office
In the years between his gubernatorial defeat and political comeback, Simon taught at Sangamon State University, where he started the Public Affairs Reporting master's degree program, and the Kennedy School of Government at Harvard University.

Rise to national prominence

US House of Representatives

Simon resumed his political career in 1974 when he was elected to Congress from Illinois's 24th congressional district, defeating former Harrisburg mayor Val Oshel. He was re-elected four times. He was later redistricted to Illinois's 22nd congressional district.

In 1978, Simon was the first recipient of the Foreign Language Advocacy Award, presented by the Northeast Conference on the Teaching of Foreign Languages in recognition of his service on the President's Commission on Foreign Language and International Studies and his support for language study.

According to the New York Times, Simon was never particularly popular with his House colleagues.

US Senate

In 1984, he ran for, and was elected to the US Senate, defeating three-term incumbent Charles H. Percy in an upset election, winning 50% of the vote.

He won re-election to the U.S. Senate in 1990 by defeating U.S. Representative Lynn Morley Martin with 65%, compared to Martin's 35%. While serving in the Senate, he co-authored an unsuccessful Balanced Budget Amendment with Republican Senator Orrin Hatch of Utah.
 
Simon gained national prominence after criticizing President George H. W. Bush during the 1992 presidential campaign, after Bush claimed a central role in causing the collapse of the Eastern bloc of the Soviet Union. During a speech at Chicago's Taste of Polonia, Bush had aggressively promoted the success of his own presidency and his importance as Vice President in the Reagan administration's role in Eastern Europe. This was an attempt by Bush to carry Chicago's Polish community in order to win Illinois during the election. Bush's claims were roundly denounced by Simon, and Bush eventually lost the state in the general election, possibly due to Simon's remarks. Simon did not seek reelection in 1996.

Presidential campaign

Simon sought the Democratic nomination for President in 1988. Mostly unknown outside of Illinois and in low single digits in national polls after his March 1987 announcement, Simon made a name for himself as the oldest, some thought most old-fashioned, candidate, with horn rimmed glasses and bow tie, and one who proudly associated himself with the New Deal liberalism associated with Presidents Franklin Roosevelt and Harry Truman.

Simon surged ahead in Iowa in October, and was, by December, the clear front-runner in that state.  However, in February 1988, Simon narrowly lost the Iowa caucus to Representative Dick Gephardt of Missouri, and finished third in the New Hampshire primary the following week, with weak showings in Minnesota and South Dakota a week later. Out of money and momentum, Simon largely skipped the key Southern "Super Tuesday" primaries on March 8, concentrating on his home state a week later, where key local Democrats were running as Simon delegates on the delegate selection ballot, and wanted to attend the Democratic National Convention regardless of Simon's slim chance of winning the nomination. Simon won the Illinois primary, and decided to make a final effort in the Wisconsin Primary in early April, but dropped out after he finished behind Governor of Massachusetts Michael Dukakis, Reverend Jesse Jackson, and Tennessee Senator Albert Gore. Simon endorsed Dukakis, who won the Democratic nomination in July, with Jackson the last active challenger.

To boost his campaign, Simon made an appearance on Saturday Night Live (SNL), co-hosting with musician Paul Simon (to whom he was not related).

Political positions

Social issues
Simon was fiercely against obscenity and violence in the media during the 1990s, and his efforts against media violence helped lead to the adoption of the V-chip.

During the 1990s, Simon opposed both the Republicans' Contract with America, and President Bill Clinton's welfare reforms. He was one of 21 Senators to vote against the Personal Responsibility and Work Opportunity Act. In 1996, Simon joined thirteen other senators (including his fellow U.S. Senator from Illinois, Carol Moseley Braun) in voting against the Defense of Marriage Act, which prohibited federal recognition of same-sex marriage.

Fiscal issues
Simon was considered a fiscal conservative, who described himself as "a pay-as-you-go Democrat." As a senator, Simon helped overhaul the college student loan program to allow students and their families to borrow directly from the federal government, thus saving money by not using private banks to disburse the loans.

Foreign affairs
Simon promoted a military response to Somalia during the presidency of George H. W. Bush. Simon was an outspoken critic of President Bill Clinton's response to the 1994 Rwandan genocide. Simon believed that America should have acted faster, and Clinton later said his belated response was the biggest mistake of his presidency. He is, together with Jim Jeffords, supported by Canadian Lieutenant-General Roméo Dallaire, Force Commander of the United Nations Assistance Mission for Rwanda from 1993 to 1994, for actively lobbying the Clinton administration into mounting a humanitarian mission to Rwanda during the genocide. According to Dallaire's book Shake Hands with the Devil, he "owe[s] a great debt of gratitude" to both senators.

Presidency
Simon believed modern presidents practice "followership," rather than leadership, saying, "We have been more and more leaning on opinion polls to decide what we're going to do, and you don't get leadership from polls... and not just at the Presidential level. It's happening with Senators, House members, and even state legislators sometimes, [when they] conduct polls to find out where people stand on something."

Simon was also a supporter of Taiwan and opposed United States policy to isolate Taiwan. He helped convince President Clinton to allow Taiwanese President Lee Teng-hui to visit the United States. He also was impressed as a teen listened to Mme Chiang Kai-shek speech and met her at 50th Anniversary of World War II reception at Capitol Hill in 1995.

Personal life

Education
Simon rose to national attention in the 1960s, due in part to his well-researched book, Lincoln's Preparation for Greatness: The Illinois Legislative Years. Despite being published 100 years after Abraham Lincoln's death, it was the first book to exhaustively cite original source documents from Lincoln's eight years in the General Assembly. He later went on to write more than 20 books on a wide range of topics, including interfaith marriages (he was a Lutheran and his wife, Jeanne, was a Catholic), global water shortages, United States Supreme Court nomination battles that focused heavily on his personal experiences with Robert Bork and Clarence Thomas, his autobiography, and even a well-received book on martyred abolitionist publisher Elijah Lovejoy. His final book, Our Culture of Pandering, was published in October 2003, two months before his death.

After his primary defeat for governor in 1972, Simon founded the Public Affairs Reporting graduate program at Sangamon State University in Springfield, Illinois, which helped launch the careers of more than 500 journalists. Simon, who had written four books at the time, also taught a course titled "Non-Fiction Magazine and Book Writing" at Sangamon State, and also taught at the John F. Kennedy School of Government in 1973.

Simon lived for many years in the small town of Makanda, Illinois, south of Carbondale, where he was a professor and director of the SIU Public Policy Institute. While there, he tried to foster the institute into becoming a think tank that could advance the lives of all people. Activities included going to Liberia and Croatia to monitor their elections, bringing major speakers to campus, denouncing the death penalty, trying to end the United States embargo against Cuba, fostering political courage among his students, promoting an amendment to the United States Constitution to end the electoral college, and attempting to limit the president to a single six-year term of office. During the electoral college fiasco that followed the 2000 election, Simon said: "I think if somebody gets the majority vote, they should be president. But, I don't think the system is going to be changed."

Family
Simon was the brother of Arthur Simon, founder of Bread for the World.

On April 21, 1960, Simon married Jeanne Hurley Simon, a member of the Illinois state legislature. It was the first time in Illinois history that two sitting members of the Illinois General Assembly married. She was an integral part of her husband's rise to national prominence. She later became a successful lawyer, author, and chair of National Commission on Libraries and Information Science. She died in February 2000 of brain cancer. Upon her death, Illinois Senator Dick Durbin delivered a tribute to Mrs. Simon on the senate floor. Their daughter, Sheila Simon, became the 46th Lieutenant Governor of Illinois in January, 2011. She previously served as a councilwoman in Carbondale, Illinois and was a law professor at Southern Illinois University.

Simon made a brief cameo appearance as himself in the 1993 political comedy film Dave.

In May 2001, Simon remarried to Patricia Derge, the widow of former Southern Illinois University President David Derge.

Culture
Simon appeared on Saturday Night Live with host and singer Paul Simon (no relation)  on December 19, 1987. Also on SNL, Simon was played by Al Franken who would later become a senator himself.

Awards 
Paul Simon was inducted as a Laureate of The Lincoln Academy of Illinois and awarded the Order of Lincoln (the state's highest honor) by the Governor of Illinois in 1998 in the area of Government. In 1999, Simon received The Lincoln Forum's Richard Nelson Current Award of Achievement.

Death and aftermath
 
Simon died in Springfield, Illinois, on December 9, 2003, at the age of 75 following heart surgery. WBBM-TV reported his death as a "massive gastric blow-out." Just four days before, despite being hospitalized and awaiting surgery, he had endorsed Howard Dean's 2004 presidential bid via a telephone conference call he conducted from his hospital bed. He was also an early supporter of Barack Obama's 2004 bid for Senate. After Simon's death, his daughter, Sheila, made a television commercial in which she declared "Barack Obama will be a U.S. Senator in the Paul Simon tradition." The ad was considered a major reason for Obama's surprise victory in the Democratic primary. In the Senate, Obama praised Simon as a "dear friend."

In July 2005, the Paul Simon Historical Museum was opened in Troy, Illinois, where Simon lived for 25 years. It included memorabilia from throughout his life, including the desk and camera from his days as a young editor of the Troy Tribune, items from his presidential campaign, and his lieutenant governor license plates. The museum closed in June 2012, due to lack of funding.
Paul Simon Chicago Job Corps is a government funding school in which was named after him. PSCJC is located in the city of Chicago in Little Village on South Kedzie Ave and is available to people between the ages of 16-24 who are looking to better themselves and create a positive future for themselves.

Publications

References

External links 
 Retrieved on 2008-07-20
 Senator Paul Simon Papers  at Southern Illinois University Carbondale Special Collections Research Center
 Jeanne Hurley Simon Papers  at Southern Illinois University Carbondale Special Collections
 U.S. Senator Paul Simon Museum
 Paul Simon Public Policy Institute
 CNN obituary
 Paul Simon Tribute in Daily Egyptian
 Our Culture of Pandering, 
 
 

|-

|-

|-

|-

|-

1928 births
2003 deaths
20th-century American politicians
American Lutherans
United States Army personnel of the Korean War
American people of German descent
Concordia University (Oregon) alumni
Dana College alumni
Democratic Party members of the United States House of Representatives from Illinois
Democratic Party United States senators from Illinois
Elijah Parish Lovejoy Award recipients
Historians of the United States
Democratic Party Illinois state senators
Harvard Kennedy School staff
Lieutenant Governors of Illinois
Democratic Party members of the Illinois House of Representatives
People from Carbondale, Illinois
People from Troy, Illinois
Politicians from Eugene, Oregon
South Eugene High School alumni
Southern Illinois University Carbondale faculty
United States Army officers
Candidates in the 1988 United States presidential election
University of Illinois at Springfield faculty
University of Oregon alumni
Writers from Illinois
Writers from Oregon
20th-century Lutherans
Military personnel from Illinois
Military personnel from Oregon